Paolo Gaidano (1861–1916) was an Italian painter, born in Poirino, in the region of the Piedmont.

From 1875 to 1878 he studied at the Accademia Albertina in Turin. He decorated the Cathedral of Carignano, and several churches in Turin.

In 1884, he exhibited Deluso, Ritratto d'uomo, and Ritratto di bambina. In 1887, he exhibited Tantum ergo.

Among his pupils was Eso Pelluzi.

References

See also
Italo Mus

1861 births
1916 deaths
People from Poirino
19th-century Italian painters
19th-century Italian male artists
Italian male painters
20th-century Italian painters
Painters from Piedmont
Accademia Albertina alumni
20th-century Italian male artists